Rokytnice is a municipality and village in Zlín District in the Zlín Region of the Czech Republic. It has about 600 inhabitants.

Administrative parts
The village of Kochavec is an administrative part of Rokytnice.

Notable people
Jindřich Mikulec (born 1928), gymnast

References

Villages in Zlín District